Waihemo is a former parliamentary electorate in the Otago region of New Zealand. It existed for two periods (1887–1890 and 1893–1902) and was represented by two Members of Parliament.

Population centres
In the 1887 electoral redistribution, although the Representation Commission was required through the Representation Act 1887 to maintain existing electorates "as far as possible", rapid population growth in the North Island required the transfer of three seats from the South Island to the north. Ten new electorates were created, including Waihemo, and one former electorate was recreated.

History
The electorate existed from 1887 to 1890 and 1893 to 1902. It was based on the small town of Waihemo, now called Dunback.

The  was contested by John McKenzie and John Buckland. McKenzie had previously represented  and Buckland had represented . McKenzie and Buckland received 493 and 422 votes, respectively. McKenzie represented the electorate until 1890, when it was abolished.

The electorate was recreated for the next 1893 general election and John McKenzie was again elected. He was reconfirmed at the next two general elections, but resigned in 1900.  This caused the 18 July 1900 Waihemo by-election, which was won by Thomas Mackenzie. He served until the end of the parliamentary term in 1902, when the electorate was again abolished.

Members of parliament 
Waihemo was represented by two Members of Parliament.

Key

Election results

1900 by-election

Notes

References

Historical electorates of New Zealand
1887 establishments in New Zealand
1893 establishments in New Zealand
1890 disestablishments in New Zealand
1902 disestablishments in New Zealand
Politics of Otago